Mohannad Nassir  (born 13 July 1980) is an Iraqi former football (soccer) midfielder who last played for Najaf.

Mohanad Nassir was a regular in the 2000 Asian Youth Championship winning team in Tehran. A few months before the finals in Tehran, the Al-Zawraa midfielder was called up by Milan Zivadinovic's assistant Barja Maric into the Iraqi B team, playing in an international tournament in Indonesia.

References

External links
 
 Profile on Goalzz.com

Iraqi footballers
Iraq international footballers
Al-Zawraa SC players
Living people
Duhok SC players
1980 births
Association football midfielders